is a semimonthly seinen manga magazine published since 18 February 1968 by Shogakukan in Japan. It was originally launched as a monthly magazine, but switched to twice monthly on the 10th and 25th beginning in April 1968. It is paired with sister magazine Big Comic Original, going on sale in the weeks Big Comic Original does not. Circulation in 2008 was reported at slightly over a half-million copies. but by mid-2015 had declined to 315,000, as part of an industry-wide trend in manga magazine sales.

The magazine has published works by a number of well-known manga artists, including Osamu Tezuka, Shotaro Ishinomori, Sanpei Shirato, Takao Saito, Fujiko A. Fujio, Fujiko F. Fujio, and Tetsuya Chiba. Big Comic also serializes Saito's Golgo 13, which is the oldest manga series still in publication. 

The front cover of the magazine featured a caricature of a famous individual by manga illustrator Shūichi Higurashi for more than forty years. Higurashi's drawings were featured on the cover of Big Comic from 1970 until 2011. Higurashi retired in the autumn of 2011 due to failing health.

List of works

Currently serialized
These series appear according to a regular schedule in the magazine.

 by Takao Saito
Hinemosu no Tari Nikki (ひねもすのたり日記) by Tetsuya Chiba (since 2015)
 by Tsuyoshi Nakaima
 by Yoichi Komori and Yutaka Toudo
 by Keisuke Yamashina
, written by Norio Hayashi and illustrated by Ken'ichirō Takai
 by Tōru Nakajima

Irregularly serialized
These series are currently serialized, but have no specific schedule for when each chapter appears in the magazine.
Uchū Kazoku Nobeyama by Jirō Okazaki

Formerly serialized
A Distant Neighborhood by Jiro Taniguchi
Akabee by Hiroshi Kurogane
Ayako by Osamu Tezuka
Barbara by Osamu Tezuka
Big Wing, written by Masao Yajima and illustrated by Shinji Hikino
C-kyū Salaryman Kōza by Keisuke Yamashina
Chūshun Komawari-kun by Tatsuhiko Yamagami
Cruise: Ishi Yamada Kōhei Kōkaishi, written by Masao Yajima and illustrated by Hiroyuki Kikuta
Double Face by Fujihiko Hosono
Eagle: The Making of an Asian-American President by Kaiji Kawaguchi
Five by Riki Kusaka, created by Yuzuru Hirayama
Gekiga ObaQ by Fujiko F. Fujio
Gekitō Magnitude 7.7 by Takao Yamaguchi
Gin no Shippo by Shinri Mori
Gringo by Osamu Tezuka
Hana China written by Yūji Nishi and illustrated by Shinji Hikino
Happyaku Yachō Hyōri no Kewaishi by Shotaro Ishinomori
Hidamari no Ki by Osamu Tezuka
Hotel by Shotaro Ishinomori
I.L. by Osamu Tezuka
The Laughing Salesman (one-shot) by Fujiko A. Fujio
The Legend of Kamui, written by Sanpei Shirato and illustrated by Tetsuji Okamoto
Kamui Gaiden by Sanpei Shirato
Kamurobamura-e by Mikio Igarashi
Kobayakawa Nobuki no Koi by Fumi Saimon
Kusakabe Shomei Kyūka Omiya-san by Shotaro Ishinomori
Minotaurus no Sara by Fujiko F. Fujio
Mirai no Omoide by Fujiko F. Fujio
Munakata Kyōju Ikōroku by Yukinobu Hoshino
MW by Osamu Tezuka
Nakaharu Koko-kun by Tatsuhiko Yamagami
Notari Matsutarō by Tetsuya Chiba
Ode to Kirihito by Osamu Tezuka
Osozaki Jijii by Yoshinori Kobayashi
The Quest for the Missing Girl by Jiro Taniguchi
Sabu to Ichi Torimono Hikae by Shotaro Ishinomori
Shō mo Nai Bokura no Renai-ron by Hidenori Hara
Sora! Flight Attendant Monogatari, written by Masao Yajima and illustrated by Shinji Hikino
Swallowing the Earth by Osamu Tezuka
Taiyō no Mokushiroku by Kaiji Kawaguchi
Tsukiji Uogashi Sandaime, written by Masaharu Nabeshima and illustrated by Mitsuo Hashimoto
Veterinarian Dolittle, written by Midori Natsu and illustrated by Kiyoshi Chikuyama

References

External links
 

1968 establishments in Japan
Semimonthly manga magazines published in Japan
Magazines established in 1968
Seinen manga magazines
Shogakukan magazines